David J. Hackford (born 3 March 1964) is a British windsurfer. He competed in the Windglider event at the 1984 Summer Olympics.

References

External links
 
 

1964 births
Living people
English windsurfers
British male sailors (sport)
Olympic sailors of Great Britain
Sailors at the 1984 Summer Olympics – Windglider
Sportspeople from Sunderland